League tables for teams participating in Ykkönen, the second tier of the Finnish Soccer League system, in 1983.

League tables

Preliminary stage

Top four to Promotion/relegation Group, the rest to Division One Relegation Group.

Promotion/relegation group

Top four to Premier Division 1984, the rest to Division One 1984.

Note: The teams obtained bonus points on the basis of their preliminary stage position.

Relegation group

Note: The points were halved (rounded upwards in uneven cases) after the preliminary stage.

See also
Mestaruussarja (Tier 1)

References

Ykkönen seasons
2
Fin
Fin